Podocarpus spathoides is a species of conifer in the family Podocarpaceae. It is found in Indonesia, Malaysia, Papua New Guinea, and Solomon Islands.

References

spathoides
Data deficient plants
Taxonomy articles created by Polbot
Taxa named by David John de Laubenfels